Gerard Leckie (6 March 1943 – 8 December 1982) was a Surinamese scientist, teacher and dean at the University of Suriname. He was one of the victims of the December murders.

Biography 
Leckie taught, was dean of the socio-economic faculty, but was also chairman of the Association for Scientific Personnel at the University of Suriname (VWPU). He studied psychology and was subsequently promoted at the University of Nijmegen.

On 24 November 1982, the Association for Democracy was founded, as a direct result of the announcement of reform plans by Dési Bouterse, which he unveiled in a speech on 15 November 1982. It consisted of people who wanted to commit themselves to the return of democracy in Suriname. Trade union actions and student demonstrations were organized, and in Paramaribo there was great unrest. The strike actions were a thorn in the eyes of Bouterse and his Group of Sixteen sergeants, who assumed that the actions were deliberately organized to cause unrest. The military saw Leckie as the instigator of the student protests; therefore he was placed on a list of opponents to be killed.

On 8 December 1982, on the personal order of Bouterse, Leckie was captured by the military, brought to prison in Fort Zeelandia, where he, after cruel torturing, was murdered, becoming one of the fifteen victims being killed by the military that day. On December 13, he was buried at the Roman Catholic cemetery in Paramaribo, next to co-victim Jozef Slagveer. According to eyewitness accounts, he had bruises in his face and a bullet hole in his chest. When the graves of the victims were opened for forensic investigation in 2002, the grave of Leckie was opened first.

References 
De Jong, T., I.M. Ahammer, C.F.M. Van Lieshout en G. Leckie, 1976. The effect of role-playing on sharing and helping in preschoolers. MS, Universiteit van Nijmegen.
Wentink, E., B. Smits-Van Sonsbeek, G. Leckie and P.P.J. Smits, 1975. The effect of a social perspective taking training on role-taking ability and social interaction in preschool and elementary school children. Paper presented at the third biennial meeting of the International Society for the Study of Behavioural Development, Guildford, Great Britain.
Gerard Leckie, Ontwikkeling van sociale cognitie. Een ontwikkelingsmodel voor rolnemingsvaardigheid bij kinderen. Nijmegen, 1975.
 8 surviving relatives of the December murders, I'll stay as long as they talk - OGV, Suriname, 2001.

External links 
 Gerard Leckie: 6 maart 1943 — 8 december 1982 Universitair Docent 
 Gerard Leckie (1943), psycholoog, universiteitsdocent 

1943 births
1982 deaths
Assassinated educators
Assassinated Surinamese people
December murders
People from Paramaribo
People murdered in Suriname
Surinamese scientists
Radboud University Nijmegen alumni
Anton de Kom University of Suriname faculty